Antrobus may refer to:

Antrobus (surname)
Antrobus, Cheshire, a village in Cheshire, England
Antrobus baronets